The Leap Years (also known as Leap of Love) is a Singapore film produced by Mediacorp Raintree Pictures, based on the novella Leap of Love by the author Catherine Lim. The production for the film started in 2005, and the film was initially to be released in December 2005 release. It was released on February 29, 2008 in Singapore.

Plot 
Li-Ann, a single and attractive teacher in a Singaporean girls' school teaches her students about an obscure leap year custom practiced in Ireland, where men cannot refuse a proposal or date from a woman should she do so on February 29; she chances upon Jeremy at Windows Cafe who becomes a major part of her life.

Setting 
In the original story, the cafe was called the Blue Paradise Café, while in the movie it was Windows Cafe. (Windows Cafe was an actual restaurant at Club Street, Singapore, at the time the movie was filmed. Though by the time the film opened, it had been replaced by a new restaurant called Seven On Club.)

Cast 
 Wong Lilin as Li-Ann (younger years - ages 24 to 36)
 Ananda Everingham as Jeremy Harvey (younger years - ages 24 to 36)
 Qi Yuwu as KS
 Joan Chen  as Li-Ann (older years - age 48)
 Jason Keng-Kwin Chan as Raymond
 Vernetta Lopez as Jennie
 Nadya Hutagalung as Suneetha
 Paula Malai Ali as Kim
 Tracy Tan as Dyllan

Production 
The Joan Chen part is not in the novella. According to director Jean Yeo, it was added as a marketing decision to get Joan Chen involved, as her presence could help with the distribution of the film. It was shot separately, and the 9 minutes of Joan Chen's part was shot by the second unit director.

Li-Lin's real life ex-husband Allan Wu makes a very brief cameo appearance as Danny, the husband of Kim (Paula Malai Ali), during Li-Ann's second leap year of meeting Jeremy.

References

External links 

The Leap Years - MediacorpRaintree.com

2008 films
Singaporean romantic drama films
Films based on short fiction
2000s English-language films